Sudan TV or Sudan National Broadcasting Corporation (SNBC) is an Arabic language television network. It is Sudan's national network and is government-owned and operated. Sudan TV is one of six television networks in the country.

History
In 1962, Sudan TV started broadcasting in the Khartoum region. The signal was accessible in the three municipalities of greater Khartoum, Omdurman and Khartoum Bahri. One year later, General Mohmaed Talat Fareed established the station as a national broadcaster and signed a contract with a West-German broadcaster to provide technical support, cameras and recorders.

In the 1970s, Sudan TV expanded its transmission range, when the General Company for Wireless and Wired Telecommunications built a satellite station. In 1976, Sudan TV started transmitting in colour.

Programming
Programming includes news, prayers, Qur'an recitation and a variety of entertainment, such as children's programmes, talent contests, dramas and documentaries. A military censor works with Sudan TV to make sure the programmes reflect government policy.

Stations
Sudan TV broadcasts on two channels and is also available via satellite.

See also
 Communications in Sudan
 Media of Sudan

References

Mass media in Sudan
Arabic-language television stations
Television channels and stations established in 1962